The 2016–17 Tulsa Golden Hurricane women's basketball team represented the University of Tulsa during the 2016–17 NCAA Division I women's basketball season. The season marked the third season for the Golden Hurricane as members of the American Athletic Conference. The Golden Hurricane, led by sixth year head coach Matilda Mossman, played their home games at the Reynolds Center.

Media
All Golden Hurricane games were broadcast on KTGX CHROME 95.3 FM and KWTU 88.7 FM HD3. The audio broadcast could also be heard on Hurricane Vision. A video stream for all home games was on Hurricane Vision, ESPN3, or AAC Digital. Road games were typically streamed on the opponents website, though conference road games could also appear on ESPN3 or AAC Digital.

Roster

Schedule and results

|-
!colspan=12 style="background:#084c9e; color:#CFB53B;"| Exhibition

|-
!colspan=12 style="background:#084c9e; color:#CFB53B;"| Non-conference regular season

|-
!colspan=12 style="background:#084c9e; color:#CFB53B;"| AAC regular season

|-
!colspan=12 style="background:#084c9e; color:#CFB53B;"| American Athletic Conference Women's Tournament

See also
 2016–17 Tulsa Golden Hurricane men's basketball team

References

Tulsa
Tulsa Golden Hurricane women's basketball seasons